The Federation of Norwegian Construction Industries (BNL) is a business and employer policy organization for companies in the construction industry. BNL is an umbrella organization for 15 industries and have more than 4,100 member companies with 74,000 employees. BNL was established in 1997 and is currently the third largest association in The Confederation of Norwegian Enterprise (NHO).

BNL organizes both manufacturing companies, plumbers, carpenters, landscape gardeners, masons, painters and entrepreneurs.

References

The current CEO is Jon Sandnes. Chairman of the board is Dag Andresen, Veidekke.

External links
 

Employers' organisations in Norway
1997 establishments in Norway
Organizations established in 1997